Bryce Janey is an American blues rock singer, guitarist, and songwriter. He has performed onstage with Kenny Neal, Buddy Guy, Tab Benoit, and Koko Taylor. In 2007, Janey was inducted into the Iowa Rock 'n' Roll Hall of Fame. Including his October 2022 release, Blue Moon Rising, Janey has issued 13 solo albums since 1995.

Life and career
He was born in Marion, Iowa, United States. He began his career at the age of 13, performing on guitar alongside his father (guitar) and mother (drums) in a family-based blues rock trio, the Janeys. They played across the area from Chicago, Illinois, to Los Angeles, California.  The family later relocated to Cedar Rapids, Iowa. The Janeys shared a stage with acts including Buddy Guy, Delbert McClinton, Blues Traveler, Johnny Winter, and Elvin Bishop. Both he and his father, Billy Lee Janey, were inducted in to the Iowa Rock 'n' Roll Hall of Fame. The duo sometimes still perform in a four- or five-piece band billed as the Janeys; although his mother no longer performs with them.

Even though he was still performing with the Janeys at the time, Bryce Janey launched his solo career in 1995, and released his debut album, Practice What You Preach, that year. His next solo release was Sweet Baby Jane (1998) via Blue Sunday Entertainment. In 1999, Bare Wire, was issued on Hot Fudge Records and garnered some positive trade magazine reviews. The same year Janey joined the Cedar Falls-based outfit, the Blue Band, as vocalist and guitarist. Janey was in the Blue Band from 1999 to 2002.

In 2001, he released his first solo live album, Live at J.M. O'Malley's. In 2010, he released Blues In My Soul. It was Janey's sixth solo release, and featured 13 tracks and saw Janey backed by Dan Johnson (bass) and Eric Douglas (drums). The album was recorded at Catamount Recording Studio and produced by Tom Tatman. Game of Life followed in 2011, which saw a release party held in Cedar Rapids. The album was Janey's eighth solo release and his second on the Grooveyard Records label. Game of Life again featured the rhythm section of Dan Johnson and Eric Douglas. Janey triumphed at the Iowa Blues Challenge in 2011, and in 2012 was an International Blues Challenge semi-finalist in Memphis, Tennessee. With his father, Billy Lee Janey, Bryce Janey stated at the time "we did a handful of festivals together this summer and will release a new Janey's Band CD for Grooveyard this winter". In 2011, he released two albums: Down Home Blues and Game of Life.  Janey also played part-time with Perry Welsh and Tommy "T-Bone" Giblin in a band called the Pumpers. Delta Road (2015) was the tenth album recorded by Janey, with Johnson and Douglas providing the rhythm. Perry Welsh played harmonica on Janey's acoustic dobro version of Robert Johnson's, "Hellhound on My Trail".  The other non-original on Delta Road was Janey's take on Rory Gallagher's "Lonesome Highway". His CD, Brand New Day, (2018) was preceded by a mainly acoustic album, Organic Man (2016).

In September 2021, Janey played live at the Electric Thread Social Club's Patio, Hotel Millwright, in Amana, Iowa.

Janey has released a number of albums on Grooveyard Records, who are based out of Rochester, New York.  He has performed at many major music festivals and clubs over the years including: B.B. Kings Blues Club in Memphis, Blues Excreta Club in Chicago, Illinois, the Kansas City Blues and Jazz Festival, Beale Street Music Festival, Buddy Guy's Legends Blues Fest (Chicago Blues Festival, 1990), Ribfest-Fort Wayne, Indiana and the Mississippi Valley Blues Festival in 2012.

Discography

Albums

References

External links
Official website
Bryce Janey - "Down Home Blues" video (2011) @ YouTube
Facebook page

Year of birth missing (living people)
Living people
American blues singers
American blues guitarists
American blues singer-songwriters
Blues rock musicians
American male guitarists
American male songwriters
Songwriters from Iowa
Guitarists from Iowa
Singers from Iowa
People from Marion, Iowa
20th-century American male singers
20th-century American singers
20th-century American guitarists
21st-century American male singers
21st-century American singers
21st-century American guitarists